Roland Šmahajčík (born 17 May 1993) is a Slovak football forward who plays for FK Tatran Turzovka.

Club career

Spartak Myjava
He made his professional debut for Spartak Myjava against FK Senica on 19 April 2014.

References

External links
 
 Eurofotbal profile
 Futbalnet profile
 MFK Dubnica profile

1993 births
Living people
Slovak footballers
Association football forwards
FK Dubnica players
Spartak Myjava players
Slovak Super Liga players
People from Žilina District
Sportspeople from the Žilina Region